The Tempest is a 1960 American TV movie based on the play by William Shakespeare. It was directed by George Schaefer, who said the play was ideal for TV because it could be easily done in 90 minutes.

Cast
Maurice Evans as Prospero
Richard Burton as Caliban
Roddy McDowall as Ariel
Lee Remick as Miranda
Tom Poston as Trinculo

References

External links
The Tempest at IMDb
The Tempest at BFI
The Tempest at Letterbox

1960 television films
1960 films
Films based on The Tempest
American television films
Films directed by George Schaefer